Erwin Rudolph (December 30, 1893 - May 19, 1957) was an American pocket billiards player from Cleveland, Ohio and a five-time world champion.  One of his great feats was running 125 points in 32 minutes (now eclipsed).

Biography
Rudolph was born on December 30, 1893, in Cleveland, Ohio. He gained national recognition in 1927 when he won the world pocket billiard title, besting Ralph Greenleaf, who held it for six years. Rudolph won the championship again in 1933, a third time in that same year and for the fourth and final time in 1941. His best run in straight pool was 277. He then went to work for the Brunswick-Balke-Collender Company. Rudolph died on May 19, 1957, in Sayre, Pennsylvania.

Legacy
Rudolph was inducted to the Billiard Congress of America Hall of Fame in 1987.

Titles & achievements
 1917 14.1 Record High Run. 152 Consecutive Balls
 1927 NBAA World Straight Pool Championship
 1927 NBAA World Straight Pool Championship
 1930 NBAA World Straight Pool Championship
 1933 NBAA World Straight Pool Championship
 1935 14.1 Record High Run. 227 Consecutive Balls
 1941 BAA World Straight Pool Championship
 1988 Billiard Congress of America Hall of Fame

References

American pool players
1893 births
1957 deaths
People from Cleveland
World champions in pool
People from Sayre, Pennsylvania